Eumenes dubius is a species of potter wasp in the subfamily Eumeninae of the family Vespidae.

Subspecies
 Eumenes dubius dubius Saussure, 1852
 Eumenes dubius palaestinensis Blüthgen, 1938

Distribution
This species can be found in southern Europe and in the Near East (Spain,  France,  Italy,  Bulgaria,  Greece,  Cyprus,  Israel,  Lebanon,  Syria,  Russia, Persia, Malta and Turkey).

Description
Eumenes dubius can reach a length of about 13 millimetres. The first metasomal segment is narrow and elongated, creating a "bulbous" appearance to the abdomen. Body is black with yellow markings. These wasps lack of standing hairs on the first tergum and show a very short general pilosity, with a short pubescence on head's rear. In males clypeus is long, with smooth and bright yellow free margin. Mandibles are  orange yellow,  basally spotted. In the females scape is ventrally yellow, while dorsally it is orange-yellow, with a thin  black  line on flagellomeres 3–9. These flagellomeres are black dorsally, while the others are orange-yellow.  The  last  flagellomere is  recurved.

Biology
These potter wasp are predatory of caterpillars. They build cells which are complete spherical pots.

Bibliography
 Antonio Giordani Soika (1952) Bull.Soc.Sci.nat.Maroc Hyménoptères réecoltés par une Mission suisse au Maroc (1947), Volume: 32 Pages: 235-267
 Horst-Günter Woydak (2001) Natur und Heimat Die solitären Faltenwespen: Eumenidae (Lehmwespen) und Masaridae (Honigwespen im Westfälischen Museum für Naturkunde Münster, Volume: 61 Pages: 85-95

References

Potter wasps
Hymenoptera of Europe
Insects described in 1852